Herzegovina University was established in 2010 in Medjugorje by merging three independent higher education institutions into University.

University organization 
Herzegovina University consists of two faculties, Faculty of Social Sciences dr Milenko Brkic (FDZMB) and Faculty of International Relations and Diplomacy (FMOD), Center for Research, Education, Development and Training, University Library, University Centers and Student Center.

Study programmes:

- Psychology,

- Special Education and Speech Treatment,

- Pedagogy and Social Pedagogy,

- Early and Pre-School Education, 

- Teacher Education,

- Sociology and Political Sciences,

- Management and Public Administration,

- Information and Communication Sciences,

- Tourism,

- Ecology and Environment Protection,

- International Relations and Diplomacy,

- Law in International Relations.

Memberships 
In 2017, Herzegovina University became a member of International Association of Universities (International Association of Universities).

In 2017, Herzegovina University became a member of Association of Rectors of Private Universities in Bosnia and Herzegovina. 

In 2021, Herzegovina University became a member of Race to Zero for Universities and Colleges Network.

In 2021, Herzegovina University became a member of GWCN (Global Waste Cleaning Network).

References

External links
 Official webpage

Education in Bosnia and Herzegovina
Universities in Bosnia and Herzegovina
Education in Mostar
Educational institutions established in 2010
2010 establishments in Bosnia and Herzegovina